The Seoul Arts Center, also referred to as SAC, is an arts complex in the Seocho-gu district of Seoul, in South Korea. It consists of five main buildings: the Opera House, with three auditoriums; the Music Hall, with two concert halls; the Hangaram Art Museum; the Hangaram Design Museum; and the Seoul Calligraphy Art Museum. The Opera House is built in a shape that resembles the traditional Korean bamboo hat called gat.

In January 1982, the government decided to build a Seoul Arts Center, which would be in charge of the overall function of artistic activities, and began to select a site. This announcement was aimed at the 1986 Asian Games and the 1988 Seoul Olympics. The final site was decided in September of the same year at the foot of the mountain between Nambu Beltway and Mt. Umyeon (area: 231,000m²), and on November 14 , 1984, a groundbreaking ceremony was held with the National Gugak Center.

The construction of the Seoul Arts Center was divided into Phase 1 (1984 ~ 1988) and Phase 2 (1988 ~ In February 1988, the first phase of construction, the Music Hall and Calligraphy Hall, was completed and opened. In October 1990, the Hangaram Art Museum and the Seoul Art Archives opened, and on February 15 , 1993 , the Seoul Opera Theater (currently the Opera House) opened and was completed.

Music hall
It opened in 1988, the first among the buildings belonging to the hall, and has a 2523-seat concert hall, the first concert hall in Korea, and a 354-seat recital hall where small-scale performances such as recitals and chamber music are held. It is adjacent to the right side of the Opera House and opposite the Seoul Calligraphy Museum.

Opera House
It is a cylindrical building with a roof in the shape of a lampshade. At the time of its design and construction, it was called "Festival Theater", but when it opened in 1993, the official name of Seoul Opera Theater (Opera House) was changed. The 2,305-seat Opera Theater for large-scale opera, ballet, and musical performances, the 710-seat Towol Theater for plays, small-scale musicals and operas, and a 300-600-seat flexible small theater for small experimental performances are located. It forms the central axis of the entire Seoul Arts Center.

Hangaram Art Museum
Opened in 1990, this museum focuses on the exhibition of contemporary art . It is a steel and glass building located on the left wing of the Opera House.

Hangaram Design Museum
Opened in 2002, this museum specializing in plastic arts is located on the right wing of the Opera House. On the 2nd and 3rd floors of the building , there is also Arko Art Information Center, an institution under the Korean Culture and Arts Council.

Seoul Calligraphy Museum
Opened in 1988 at the same time as the Music Hall, it is currently the only exhibition hall dedicated to calligraphy works in the world. In addition to traditional calligraphy works, experimental works by contemporary calligraphers are also on display.

Other facilities
There is an outdoor space named Music Square, Art Square, and Staircase Square between each performance hall and art gallery. There is a short hiking trail next to the fountain, which is also used by hikers.

There are also restaurants, cafes, cafeterias, musical instrument stores, costume rental stores, record stores, reservations, and children's playrooms. Although not affiliated with the hall, teachers at the Korea National University of Arts Conservatory and Dance Center and the National Gugak Center continue to the right side of the Music Hall and Calligraphy Hall to provide education and tradition It is being used as a venue for artistic performances.

The Academy of Arts, an educational institution, is divided into three fields, music, art, and calligraphy, and is used as a place for citizens to enjoy lectures on hobbies, appreciation meetings, and education for the gifted.

The center is home to the Korea National Ballet, the Korea National Opera, the Korean Symphony Orchestra, the Korea National Contemporary Dance Company and the National Chorus of Korea. 

Established in 1988 to "develop and promote art and culture, and to expand people’s opportunities for cultural enjoyment," the center has developed into the representative art and culture complex in Korea.

References

Buildings and structures in Seocho District
Arts centres in South Korea
Theatres in South Korea
Concert halls in South Korea
Buildings and structures in Seoul
Culture of Seoul
Tourist attractions in Seoul